Möser is a municipality in the Jerichower Land district, in Saxony-Anhalt, Germany.

On 1 January 2010, the municipality (Einheitsgemeinde) of Möser was formed by the merger of six former municipalities. These six former municipalities became Ortschaften or municipal divisions of the new municipality Möser:
 Hohenwarthe
 Körbelitz
 Lostau
 Möser
 Pietzpuhl
 Schermen

References

 
Jerichower Land